Eithan Urbach (born 12 January 1977 in Haifa) is a former backstroke swimmer from Israel. Urbach competed in two events in the 1996 Summer Olympics and the 2000 Summer Olympics. In 1997, Urbach shared Israel's Sportsman of the Year award.

See also
 List of select Jewish swimmers

References

External links
 

1977 births
Living people
Auburn Tigers men's swimmers
Male backstroke swimmers
Israeli expatriates in the United States
Israeli Jews
Israeli male models
Israeli male swimmers
Jewish swimmers
Olympic swimmers of Israel
Sportspeople from Haifa
Models from Haifa
Swimmers at the 1996 Summer Olympics
Swimmers at the 2000 Summer Olympics
European Aquatics Championships medalists in swimming
Jewish male models